New River Company General Office Building is a historic commercial building located at Mt. Hope, Fayette County, West Virginia. It was built in 1917, and is a two-story, "U" shaped brick building.  It is five bays wide.  It features a stepped parapet with clay tile coping. The interior has original light fixtures, unpainted woodwork, and hardwood floors.

It was listed on the National Register of Historic Places in 2004.

References

Office buildings completed in 1917
Buildings and structures in Fayette County, West Virginia
Buildings designated early commercial in the National Register of Historic Places in West Virginia
National Register of Historic Places in Fayette County, West Virginia
Office buildings on the National Register of Historic Places in West Virginia